Sour mix (also known as sweet and sour mix) is a mixer that is yellow-green in color and is used in many cocktails. It is made from approximately equal parts lemon and/or lime juice and simple syrup and shaken vigorously with ice. This produces a pearly-white liquid with a pronounced flavor.

Optionally, egg whites may be added to make the liquid slightly foamy.

Sour mix can be mixed with liquor(s) to make a sour drink; most common are vodka sour (vodka) and whiskey sour (whiskey).

Pre-mixed versions are available and are used in many bars.  These typically consist of a powder which must be rehydrated by adding water prior to use.

References

See also
List of cocktails

Drink mixers